Trichoncyboides is a monotypic genus of  sheet weavers containing the single species, Trichoncyboides simoni. It was first described by J. Wunderlich in 2008, and is found in Europe, Germany, Switzerland, and Czechia.

See also
 List of Linyphiidae species (Q–Z)

References

Linyphiidae
Monotypic Araneomorphae genera